Phloeosinus is a genus of cedar bark beetles in the family Curculionidae. There are at least 20 described species in Phloeosinus.

Species

References

Further reading

 
 
 
 

Scolytinae